Juan de Tassis may refer to:

 Juan de Tassis, 1st Count of Villamediana
 Juan de Tassis, 2nd Count of Villamediana